Spurzem may refer to:

People
 Rainer Spurzem, German astrophysicist

Geography
 Spurzem creek in Minnesota

Miscellaneous
 The Spurzem collection of painter Gabriel Laderman